An ordinance is a term used by certain Christian denominations for a religious ritual that was instituted by Jesus for Christians to observe. 

Examples of ordinances include baptism and the Lord's Supper, both of which are practiced in denominations including the Anabaptist, Baptist, Churches of Christ, and Pentecostal traditions. Some churches, including those of the Anabaptist tradition, include headcovering and footwashing as ordinances.

The number of ordinances depends on the Christian denomination, with Mennonite Anabaptists counting seven ordinances, while Baptists may name two or three, for example.

Distinctions
Christian traditions, including Anabaptists (such as Mennonites and Schwarzenau Brethren), Baptists, Churches of Christ, Christian Churches/Churches of Christ, Disciples of Christ, refer to "ordinances", rather than "sacraments". While a sacrament is seen as a means of grace from God, an ordinance is a practice that rather demonstrates the participants' faith. Roman Catholics, Eastern Orthodox, and many historic Protestant traditions (Lutherans, Anglicans, Methodists, Moravians, Continental Reformed, Presbyterians and Congregationalists) prefer the use of the term "sacrament".

Seven ordinances have been taught in many Conservative Mennonite churches, which include "baptism, communion, footwashing, marriage, anointing with oil, the holy kiss, and the prayer covering."

The Dunkard Brethren Church, a Conservative Anabaptist denomination in the Schwarzenau Brethren tradition, includes baptism, feetwashing, communion, the holy kiss, headcovering, and anointing of the sick among the ordinances of the Church. Feetwashing, communion and the holy kiss occur during the lovefeast. 

Some Baptists teach two ordinances, baptism and the Lord's Supper, while others include additional ordinances, such as "the laying on of hands after baptism" as expressed in the Standard Confession (1660).

The Church of Jesus Christ of Latter-day Saints (Mormons) uses the term "ordinance", however the underlying belief is sacramental.  Rituals such as baptism, confirmation, initiatory (Chrismation)[see: washing and anointing], ordination, endowment (formal vows and reception of sacred vestments) and marriage are referred to as "saving ordinances", as they are considered transformative and necessary for salvation and exaltation. Similar to Catholic sacraments, Mormon ordinances are  only considered valid if performed by ordained clergy with apostolic succession reaching back to Jesus through Peter.

See also
 Born again
 Worship service (evangelicalism)
 Infused righteousness
 Ordinance (Latter Day Saints)
 Sola gratia

References

Protestant theology
Sacraments
Christian terminology